Jeffrey "Jeff" Hilton (born 27 May 1972) is a former Australian rules footballer who played with St Kilda and Melbourne in the Australian Football League (AFL).

Hilton was a utility player, recruited to St Kilda from Dromana. He only managed to break into the seniors at St Kilda six times and switched clubs in the 1992 National Draft, selected by Melbourne at pick 99.

In his first season with Melbourne he was restricted to the reserves and was a member of their premiership team. He was, however, regularly selected in 1994, making 19 appearances, three of them in finals. In 1995 he also played 19 games but he added just five more games in 1996 and was delisted.
 
He went to Western Australian club Peel Thunder in 1997.

References

External links
 
 

1972 births
Living people
Australian rules footballers from Victoria (Australia)
St Kilda Football Club players
Melbourne Football Club players
Peel Thunder Football Club players